Tennessee Online Public School is a virtual high school in Tennessee serving 208 students in grades K-12. It is unranked by U.S. News & World Report.

It is one of nine virtual schools in the state.

Operations
The Tennessee General Assembly passed the “Virtual Public Schools Act" (2011) authorizing this school and the others in the state.

Tennessee and nearby states offer government sponsored virtual schools as a means to support homeschooling. Indiana offers Hoosier Academy Virtual Charter School serving 3,861 and Indiana Virtual School serving 1,320 students in grades 6-12. Ohio Virtual Academy serves 9,466 students in grades K-12.

References

Online schools in the United States
Public schools in Tennessee
High schools in Tennessee
2012 establishments in Tennessee